Leon Hylton (born 27 January 1983) is an English former footballer who played as a defender.

Career

Hylton started his career with English Premier League side Aston Villa. Before the second half of 2002–03, Hylton was sent on loan to Swansea City in the English fourth tier, where he made 21 appearances and scored 0 goals and suffered injuries. On 11 February 2003, he debuted for Swansea City during a 0–3 loss to Bournemouth.

He played three times for England U20 and was part of the England squad at the 2003 Toulon Tournament.

References

External links
 

1983 births
Association football defenders
Aston Villa F.C. players
English expatriate footballers
English Football League players
English footballers
England youth international footballers
Expatriate footballers in Wales
Swansea City A.F.C. players
Living people